Theophilus Augustus Thompson (April 21, 1855 - after 1940?) is the earliest documented African-American chess expert recognized in the United States. In addition to competing in tournaments, he wrote a book Chess Problems: Either to Play and Mate published in 1873.

Early life
Thompson was born into slavery in Frederick, Maryland, as were his parents. After emancipation, in 1868, he worked as a house servant in Carroll County, Maryland, but returned to Frederick in 1870.

Career
In April 1872, Thompson witnessed the game for the first time, in a match between John K. Hanshew and another man. Hanshew, who was the publisher of The Maryland Chess Review, gave Thompson a chessboard and some chess problems to solve. Thompson showed an immediate ability to learn the game and master its rules.
Thompson's fame grew and he competed in a number of tournaments.

He gained lasting fame for his book of endgame positions: Chess Problems: Either to Play and Mate (1873). It was published by Orestes Brownson Jr., the editor of the Dubuque Chess Journal, for whom Thompson also worked as a servant.

Thompson faded into obscurity soon after gaining prominence with his book, and there is some uncertainty about the remainder of his life. The Dubuque Chess Journal closed in 1875 and Brownson Jr. died soon after, leaving Thompson without a job. There were rumors that he may have been the victim of a racial lynching. However, the 1880 U.S. Census shows a Theophilus Thompson, 24 years of age, in his home state of Maryland working as an oysterman in Anne Arundel County. Later on, the 1920 census lists this person as a waterman in the oyster industry, overestimated as 69 year old, married to Alice C. (39 years old) and with two children (Dorene and Ellsworth) age 10 and 9. In the 1930 and 1940 censuses, he lived in Churchton, Maryland, with increasingly overestimated ages of 80 and 91 years.

The U.S. Chess Center in Washington D.C. hosts the Theophilus Thompson Chess Club in his honor on Saturday afternoons.

References

External links
 Chess Problems by Theophilus A. Thompson at Google Books
 The games of Thompson at ChessGames.com

1855 births
1940s deaths
African-American chess players
African-American sportsmen
American chess writers
American male non-fiction writers
19th-century American slaves
People from Carroll County, Maryland
People from Frederick, Maryland
20th-century African-American people